Mein Gaddi Aap Chalawan Ga (Punjabi: میں گڈی آپ چلاواں گا) was fourth pop music album released by Pakistani singer Abrar-ul-Haq. It is a compilation and studio album, and has only one new track.

Track listing
"Main Gaddi Aap"
"Cycle"
"Jat"
"Kuriyan"
"Nuch Lain De"
"Wan Kutia"
"Majajni"
"GT Road" 
"Hello Hello"
"Bolian"
"Sanu Tere Nal"
"December"

External links 
 Abrar-ul-Haq's Official Website

Abrar-ul-Haq albums
2000 compilation albums